Loci communes is a book by Philip Melanchthon.

Loci communes may also refer to:

 Loci theologici, a rhetorical method
 Loci communes (Pseudo-Maximus), an anonymous Greek florilegium
 Loci communes, a major work in the Peter Martyr Vermigli bibliography
 Loci Communes (Antonius Melissa), an 11th-century compilation of moral sentences